The 2010 Colombia–Venezuela diplomatic crisis was a diplomatic stand-off between Colombia and Venezuela over allegations in July by Colombian President Álvaro Uribe that the Venezuelan government was actively permitting the FARC and ELN guerrillas to seek safe haven in its territory. Uribe presented evidence to the Organization of American States (OAS) allegedly drawn from laptops acquired in a raid on a FARC camp in Ecuador (which had sparked the 2008 Andean diplomatic crisis).

In response to the allegations Venezuela broke off diplomatic relations, amid speculation of a possible war. The crisis was resolved after Juan Manuel Santos was inaugurated as the new President of Colombia on  2010, after the intervention of UNASUR who brought together Santos and Venezuelan President Hugo Chávez. Chávez then told the guerrillas that there could be no military solution to the internal Colombia conflict, and Santos agreed to turn over the disputed laptops to the Ecuadorean government. Both countries then agreed to re-establish diplomatic relations.

Increase in tensions
In reaction to Colombian allegations that there was evidence showing FARC and ELN guerrilla camps established on the Venezuelan side of the border, Venezuelan Foreign Minister Nicolás Maduro recalled his country's ambassador to Colombia for "discussions." On  the Colombian foreign ministry said its ambassador, María Luisa Chiappe, would be recalled "to evaluate the situation", following which they would present evidence at the OAS' emergency meeting.

On 16 July, as a press briefing at the US State Department, a spokesman said "some of this is not new in the sense that there have been concerns for some time of cross-border interaction involvement in insurgent activities or terrorist activities within Colombia. Venezuela is obliged, as a member of the United Nations, the OAS, and UNASUR, to deny terrorist groups the ability to operate within its territory. We've been concerned about this for some time and it's one of the reasons why, since 2006, Venezuela has been judged not to be fully cooperating on anti-terrorism efforts."

On 22 July, Venezuelan President Hugo Chávez announced that "for dignity's sake" he was breaking off relations with Colombia as a response to Colombia's accusations.

A few days later Chávez threatened to cut off oil exports to the United States if Colombia launched a military attack. "If there was any armed aggression against Venezuela from Colombian territory or from anywhere else, promoted by the Yankee empire, we would suspend oil shipments to the United States even if we have to eat stones here." He also cancelled a trip to Cuba on the grounds that  "the possibility of an armed aggression against Venezuelan territory from Colombia" was higher than it has been "in 100 years." This was followed by a denial from Colombian President Uribe that plans were underway to attack Venezuela amid Chávez's call that Uribe was "capable of anything." Uribe's spokesman, César Velásquez, said "Colombia has never thought of attacking [Venezuela], as its president has told his country in a clearly deceptive move. [Colombia] continues to insist [on the application of international law to ensure Venezuela] complies with its obligation not to harbour Colombian terrorists."

Reconciliation
On August 10, just days after Colombia's new president, Juan Manuel Santos, was sworn in at a ceremony attended by Venezuela's Maduro, both he and Chavez agreed to restore bilateral relations and re-establish diplomatic ties "based on transparent and direct dialogue." Santos said he received assurances from Chavez that he would not allow guerrilla groups to set up camp inside Venezuela. The two also expressed optimism that their first meeting would produce positive results. in Santa Marta, Colombia. This was a result of mediation by UNASUR Secretary General Néstor Kirchner who said "We Latin Americans have proved we can solve our own problems."    
    
The agreement between the two presidents included the setting up of bilateral commissions related to commercial, economic, social investment, infrastructure and security issues. The agreement stated the objective of enduring stable bilateral relations through adherence to international law, the principles of noninterference in internal affairs, and respect for national sovereignty and territorial integrity. Venezuela admitted that Colombia has a legal right to sign military agreements with the United States, "as long as none of those accords affects the sovereignty of neighbours or becomes a threat."    
   
Santos was upbeat regarding the meeting. "President Chávez and I are putting the interests of our people above personal conveniences." In turn Chavez told Santos, "Count on my friendship." The two presidents pledged to send ambassadors to each other's capital cities, and work on further details involving finance and military issues. he said he received assurances from Chávez that he would not allow guerrilla groups to set up camp inside Venezuela. Chávez already sent two infantry brigade near borders and air forces to stop any possible FARC activities on Venezuelan territory. The two also expressed optimism that their first meeting would produce positive results. A large factor in the reconciliation was collapsing trade between the neighbouring countries' economies. The New York Times also cited a former U.S. ambassador to Colombia saying that both men were likely to be in power in their nations for much of the coming decade, "so it would be in both of their interests to learn to get along."

See also

 Colombia–Venezuela relations
 2008 Andean diplomatic crisis

References

Colombia–Venezuela relations
Colombia-Venezuela diplomatic crisis
Colombia-Venezuela diplomatic crisis